Karl-Heinz Prudöhl (born 3 December 1944) is a German rower who competed for East Germany in the 1976 Summer Olympics.

He was born in Eberhardsdorf. In 1976, he was a crew member of the East German boat, which won the gold medal in the eight event.

References

External links
 

1944 births
Living people
People from Starogard County
Sportspeople from Pomeranian Voivodeship
People from West Prussia
Olympic rowers of East Germany
Rowers at the 1976 Summer Olympics
Olympic gold medalists for East Germany
Olympic medalists in rowing
East German male rowers
World Rowing Championships medalists for East Germany
Medalists at the 1976 Summer Olympics
European Rowing Championships medalists
National People's Army military athletes